Sulcanus is a monotypic genus of crustaceans belonging to the monotypic family Sulcanidae. The only species is Sulcanus conflictus.

The species is found in Australia and New Zealand.

References

Calanoida
Copepod genera
Monotypic crustacean genera